The River Douglas is a river on the Isle of Man. The river begins on the outskirts of Douglas where the River Glass and River Dhoo meet.

Rivers of the Isle of Man